Ćićevac is a town and municipality located in the Rasina District of central Serbia. According to 2011 census, the population of the town is 4,681, while the population of the municipality is 9,446.

Demographics

According to the 2011 census results, the municipality of Ćićevac has a population of 9,476 inhabitants.

Ethnic groups
The ethnic composition of the municipality:

Economy
The following table gives a preview of total number of employed people per their core activity (as of 2017):

References

External links

 .

Populated places in Rasina District
Municipalities and cities of Šumadija and Western Serbia